Amir Turgeman (born May 10, 1972) is a former Israeli international football player and currently the manager of Hapoel Kfar Saba. While playing for Ironi Ashdod during the 1994/95 season, Turgeman scored seventeen league goals and shared the golden boot award with Ashdod native and Maccabi Haifa striker, Haim Revivo.

He is Jewish.

Honors

As a player

Maccabi Tel Aviv 
Israeli Premier League (2):
1991-92, 2002-03
Israel State Cup (1):
2002

As a manager

Maccabi Tel Aviv 
Israeli Youth Championship (2):
2010-11, 2011–12
Youth State Cup (1):
2011

References

1972 births
Living people
Israeli Jews
Israeli footballers
Maccabi Tel Aviv F.C. players
Maccabi Ironi Ashdod F.C. players
Hapoel Haifa F.C. players
Maccabi Haifa F.C. players
Beitar Jerusalem F.C. players
F.C. Ashdod players
Hakoah Maccabi Amidar Ramat Gan F.C. players
Liga Leumit players
Israeli Premier League players
Israeli people of Moroccan-Jewish descent
Footballers from Ashdod
Israel international footballers
Israel under-21 international footballers
Israeli football managers
Beitar Tel Aviv Bat Yam F.C. managers
F.C. Ashdod managers
Bnei Sakhnin F.C. managers
Sektzia Ness Ziona F.C. managers
Hapoel Kfar Saba F.C. managers
Israeli Premier League managers
Association football forwards